The Museum of Pop Culture or MoPOP is a nonprofit museum in Seattle, Washington, dedicated to contemporary popular culture. It was founded by Microsoft co-founder Paul Allen in 2000 as the Experience Music Project. Since then MoPOP has organized dozens of exhibits, 17 of which have toured across the U.S. and internationally.

The museumformerly known as Experience Music Project and Science Fiction Museum and Hall of Fame (EMP|SFM) and later EMP Museum until November 2016—has initiated many public programs including "Sound Off!", an annual 21-and-under battle-of-the-bands that supports the all-ages scene; and "Pop Conference", an annual gathering of academics, critics, musicians, and music buffs.

MoPOP, in collaboration with the Seattle International Film Festival (SIFF), presents the Science Fiction and Fantasy Short Film Festival which takes place every winter. Since 2007, the MoPop celebrates recording artists with the Founders Award for their noteworthy contributions.

Exhibits and activities

MoPOP is home to numerous exhibits and interactive activity stations as well as sound sculpture and various educational resources:
 A  building, designed by Frank O. Gehry, housing several galleries and the Sky Church, which features a Barco C7 black package LED screen, one of the largest indoor LED screens in the world.
 Exhibits covering pop culture, from the art of fantasy, horror cinema, and video games to science fiction literature and costumes from screen and stage.
 Interactive activities included in galleries like Sound Lab and On Stage where visitors can explore hands-on the tools of rock and roll through instruments, and perform music before a virtual audience.
 IF VI WAS IX, a guitar sculpture consisting of more than 500 musical instruments and 30 computers conceived by British exhibit designer Neal Potter and developed by sound sculptor Trimpin.
 The world's largest collection of artifacts, hand-written lyrics, personal instruments, and original photographs celebrating the music and history of Seattle musician Jimi Hendrix and the band Nirvana.
 Educational resources including MoPOP's Curriculum Connections in-museum workshops and outreach programs; STAR (Student Training in Artistic Reach); Creativity Camps for Kids; Teen Artist Workshops; Write Out of This World, an annual sci-fi and fantasy short story contest for 3rd to 12th graders; and the Hip-Hop Artist Residency.
 Public programs such as MoPOP's Science Fiction + Fantasy Short Film Festival, Pop Conference, the Youth Advisory Board (YAB), and Sound Off!, the Pacific Northwest's premier battle-of-the-bands.

MoPOP was also the location of the first NIME workshop's concert and demo program. This subsequently became the annual International Conference on New Interfaces for Musical Expression, a leading venue for cutting-edge research on music technology.

Science Fiction Museum

The Science Fiction Museum and Hall of Fame was founded by Paul Allen and his sister Jody Patton, and opened to the public on June 18, 2004. It incorporated the Science Fiction and Fantasy Hall of Fame which had been established in 1996. The museum was divided into several galleries with themes such as "Homeworld", "Fantastic Voyages", "Brave New Worlds", and "Them!", each displaying related memorabilia (movie props, first editions, costumes, and models) in large display cases, posters, and interactive displays. It was said about the museum that "From robots to jet packs to space suits and ray guns, it's all here."

Members of the museum's advisory board included Steven Spielberg, Ray Bradbury, James Cameron, and George Lucas. Among its collection of artifacts were Captain Kirk's command chair from Star Trek, the B9 robot from Lost in Space, the Death Star model from Star Wars, the T-800 Terminator and the dome from the film Silent Running. Although the Science Fiction Museum as a permanent collection was de-installed in March 2011, a new exhibit named Icons of Science Fiction opened as a replacement in June 2012. At this time the new Hall of Fame display was unveiled and the class of 2012 inducted.

Science Fiction and Fantasy Hall of Fame

The Science Fiction and Fantasy Hall of Fame was founded in 1996 by the Kansas City Science Fiction and Fantasy Society and the Center for the Study of Science Fiction (CSSF) at the University of Kansas (KU). The chairmen were Keith Stokes (1996–2001) and Robin Wayne Bailey (2002–2004). Only writers and editors were eligible for recognition and four were inducted annually, two deceased and two living. Each class of four was announced at Kansas City's annual science fiction convention, ConQuesT, and inducted at the Campbell Conference hosted by CSSF.

The Hall of Fame stopped inducting fantasy writers after 2004, when it became part of the Science Fiction Museum affiliated with the Museum of Pop Culture, under the name "Science Fiction Hall of Fame". Having inducted 36 writers in nine years, the organization began to recognize non-literary media in 2005. It retained the quota of four new members and thus reduced the annual number of writers. The 2005 and 2006 press releases placed new members in "Literature", "Art", "Film, Television and Media", and "Open" categories, one for each category. In 2007 and 2008, the fourth inductee was placed in one of the three substantial categories.

MoPOP de-installed the Science Fiction Museum in March 2011. When the "Icons of Science Fiction" exhibition opened in June 2012, a new Hall of Fame display was unveiled and the class of 2012 was inducted.

Nominations are submitted by the public, but the selections are made by "award-winning science fiction authors, artists, editors, publishers, and film professionals."

MoPOP restored the original name online during June 2013 and announced five new members, one daily, beginning June 17, 2013. The first four were cited largely or wholly for science fiction works, however the final one was J.R.R. Tolkien, who was "hailed as the father of modern fantasy literature".

20th anniversary

In 2016, the Hall of Fame's 20th anniversary year, the scope was changed again to include not only creators, but creations (from such genres as Cinema, Television and Games), with two examples of each being honoured. A total of 20 additional inductees in both categories were also announced. The class of 2017 brought the number of members to 92, plus 20 added in 2016 to celebrate the Hall of Fame's anniversary.

Science Fiction and Fantasy Hall of Fame inductions
 1996: Jack Williamson; A. E. van Vogt; John W. Campbell, Jr.; Hugo Gernsback
 1997: Andre Norton; Arthur C. Clarke; H. G. Wells; Isaac Asimov
 1998: Hal Clement; Frederik Pohl; C. L. Moore; Robert A. Heinlein
 1999: Ray Bradbury; Robert Silverberg; Jules Verne; Abraham Merritt
 2000: Poul Anderson; Gordon R. Dickson; Theodore Sturgeon; Eric Frank Russell
 2001: Jack Vance; Ursula K. Le Guin; Alfred Bester; Fritz Leiber
 2002: Samuel R. Delany; Michael Moorcock; James Blish; Donald A. Wollheim
 2003: Wilson Tucker; Kate Wilhelm; Damon Knight; Edgar Rice Burroughs
 2004: Brian Aldiss; Harry Harrison; Mary Wollstonecraft Shelley; E. E. "Doc" Smith 
 2005: Steven Spielberg; Philip K. Dick; Chesley Bonestell; Ray Harryhausen
 2006: George Lucas; Frank Herbert; Frank Kelly Freas; Anne McCaffrey
 2007: Ed Emshwiller; Gene Roddenberry; Ridley Scott; Gene Wolfe
 2008: Ian Ballantine and Betty Ballantine; William Gibson; Richard M. Powers; Rod Serling
 2009: Edward L. Ferman; Michael Whelan; Frank R. Paul; Connie Willis
 2010: Octavia E. Butler; Richard Matheson; Douglas Trumbull; Roger Zelazny
 2011: Vincent Di Fate; Gardner Dozois; Harlan Ellison; Jean Giraud
 2012: Joe Haldeman; James Tiptree, Jr.; James Cameron; Virgil Finlay 
 2013: H. R. Giger; Judith Merril; Joanna Russ; David Bowie; J. R. R. Tolkien
 2014: Frank Frazetta; Hayao Miyazaki; Leigh Brackett; Olaf Stapledon; Stanley Kubrick
 2015: James E. Gunn; Georges Méliès; John Schoenherr; Kurt Vonnegut; Jack Gaughan
 2016: Terry Pratchett; Douglas Adams; Star Trek; Blade Runner
 2017: J. K. Rowling; Stan Lee; The Legend of Zelda; Buffy the Vampire Slayer
 2018: Neil Gaiman; Vonda N. McIntyre; Doctor Who; Magic: The Gathering
 2019: Ted Chiang; D. C. Fontana; Star Wars; Watchmen
 2021: Nichelle Nichols, Sigourney Weaver, Godzilla, A Trip to the Moon

Twenty other creators and works were inducted into the Hall of Fame to celebrate its 20th anniversary:
 Creators: Margaret Atwood; Keith David; Guillermo del Toro; Terry Gilliam; Jim Henson; Jack Kirby; Madeleine L'Engle; C. S. Lewis; H. P. Lovecraft; Leonard Nimoy; George Orwell; Rumiko Takahashi; John Williams
 Works: 2001: A Space Odyssey; Dungeons & Dragons; The Matrix; Myst; The Princess Bride; Wonder Woman; The X-Files

MoPOP rebrand
In November 2016 EMP Museum announced it would be rebranding itself as the Museum of Pop Culture, or MoPOP for short.

Architecture

MoPOP is located on the campus of Seattle Center, adjacent to the Space Needle and the Seattle Center Monorail, which runs through the building. The structure itself was designed by Frank Gehry and resembles many of his firm's other works in its sheet-metal construction, such as Guggenheim Museum Bilbao, Walt Disney Concert Hall, and Gehry Tower. Much of the building material is exposed in the building's interior. The building contains , with a  footprint. The name of the museum's central Sky Church pays homage to Jimi Hendrix. A concert venue capable of holding up to 800 guests, the last structural steel beam to be put in place bears the signatures of all construction workers who were on site on the day it was erected. Hoffman Construction Company of Portland, Oregon, was the general contractor, while Magnusson Klemencic Associates of Seattle were the structural engineers for the project.

Even before groundbreaking, the Seattle Weekly said the design could refer to "the often quoted comparison to a smashed electric guitar." Gehry himself had in fact made the comparison: "We started collecting pictures of Stratocasters, bringing in guitar bodies, drawing on those shapes in developing our ideas." The architecture was greeted by Seattle residents with a mixture of acclaim for Gehry and derision for this particular edifice. British-born, Seattle-based writer Jonathan Raban remarked that "Frank Gehry has created some wonderful buildings, like the Guggenheim Museum in Bilbao, but his Seattle effort, the Experience Music Project, is not one of them." New York Times architecture critic Herbert Muschamp described it as "something that crawled out of the sea, rolled over, and died." Forbes magazine called it one of the world's 10 ugliest buildings. Others describe it as a "blob" or call it "The Hemorrhoids". Despite some critical reviews of the structure, the building has been called "a fitting backdrop for the world's largest collection of Jimi Hendrix memorabilia." The building's exterior, which features a fusion of textures and colors including gold, silver, deep red, blue and a "shimmering purple haze," has been declared "an apt representation of the American rock experience."

Finances
The museum has had mixed financial success. In an effort to raise more funds, museum organizers used Allen's extensive art collection to create a 2006 exhibit at the museum entitled DoubleTake: From Monet to Lichtenstein. The exhibit included Roy Lichtenstein's The Kiss (1962), Pierre-Auguste Renoir's The Reader (1877), Vincent van Gogh's Orchard with Peach Trees in Blossom (1888), Pablo Picasso's Four Bathers (1921) and several works of art from Claude Monet including one of the Water Lilies paintings (1919) and The Mula Palace (1908). Since then the museum has organized numerous exhibitions focused more specifically on popular culture, such as Sound and Vision: Artists Tell Their Stories, which opened February 28, 2007. This brought together both music and science fiction in a single exhibit, and drew on the museum's extensive collection of oral history recordings. The museum's recent exhibitions have ranged from horror cinema, video games, and black leather jackets to fantasy film and literature.

Founders Award
Since 2007, the Museum of Pop Culture's Founders Award has celebrated artists whose "noteworthy contributions continue to nurture the next generation of risk-takers". The annual benefit gala is key in funding the museum's educational programs, community engagement, and exhibitions. In 2020, due to the COVID-19 pandemic, the gala had to be cancelled and for the first time ever, the event was made free to the public, streaming online on December 1, 2020, as MoPOP honored Seattle's own Alice in Chains. The benefit streaming raised more than $600,000 for MoPOP in its first night. A compilation featuring highlights from the tribute was made available for streaming on Amazon Music.

Recipients
 2007: Ann & Nancy Wilson
 2008: Robbie Robertson
 2009: Steve Cropper
 2010: Billy Cox
 2011: Buddy Guy
 2012: Carlos Santana
 2013: Crosby, Stills & Nash
 2014: Jackson Browne
 2015: Jimmy Page
 2016: Joe Walsh
 2017: The Doors
 2018: John Fogerty
 2019: Brandi Carlile
 2020: Alice in Chains
 2022: Quincy Jones

See also
 List of music museums

References

External links

 Museum of Pop Culture official website 
 Science Fiction and Fantasy Hall of Fame official website
 SeattleWiki: Experience Music Project
 Experience Music Project at greatbuildings.com
 New Interfaces for Musical Expression – NIME-01
 "Exhibitions / Past Exhibitions". EMP Museum (empmuseum.org)
 "Exhibitions / Past Exhibitions". Experience Music Project and Science Fiction Museum (empsfm.org). Archived 2007-09-23. Retrieved 2013-03-19.
 "Exhibitions / Past Exhibitions". Experience Music Project and Science Fiction Museum (empsfm.org). Archived 2011-01-27. Retrieved 2013-03-19.
 "Exhibitions / Past Exhibitions". EMP Museum (empmuseum.org). Archived 2012-07-18. Retrieved 2013-03-19.

Museums in Seattle
Media museums in Washington (state)
Music museums in the United States
Biographical museums in Washington (state)
Deconstructivism
Expressionist architecture
Frank Gehry buildings
Halls of fame in Washington (state)
Postmodern architecture in Washington (state)
Rock music museums
 
Seattle Center
Webby Award winners
Museums established in 2000
2000 establishments in Washington (state)
2000s architecture in the United States
Oral history